The following is a partial list of state universities in Brazil.

Alagoas
 (UNEAL)
 (UNCISAL)

Amapá
 (UEAP)

Amazonas 
 Amazonas State University (UEA)

Bahia 
 Bahia State University (UNEB)
 State University of Santa Cruz (UESC)
 State University of Southwestern Bahia (UESB)
 State University of Feira de Santana (UEFS)

Ceará 
 Ceará State University (UECE)
 State University of Vale do Acaraú (UVA)

Goiás
 Goiás State University (UEG)

Maranhão 
 Universidade Estadual do Maranhão (UEMA)
 Universidade Estadual da Região Tocantina do Maranhão (UEMASUL)

Mato Grosso
 Mato Grosso State University (UNEMAT)

Mato Grosso do Sul 
 Mato Grosso do Sul State University (UEMS)

Minas Gerais 
 Minas Gerais State University (UEMG)
 State University of Montes Claros (Unimontes)

Pará
 Pará State University (UEPA)

Paraíba 
 Paraíba State University (UEPB)

Paraná 
 Londrina State University (UEL)
 Maringa State University (UEM)
 Ponta Grossa State University (UEPG)
  (UNICENTRO)
 University of the State of Paraná (UNESPAR)
 Western Paraná State University (Unioeste)

Pernambuco 
 State University of Pernambuco (UPE)

Piauí 
  (UESPI)

Rio de Janeiro 
 State University of Northern Rio de Janeiro (UENF) 
 Rio de Janeiro State University (UERJ)
 West Zone State University (UEZO)

Rio Grande do Norte
 (UERN)

Rio Grande do Sul 
 Rio Grande do Sul State University  (UERGS)

Santa Catarina 
 University of the State of Santa Catarina (UDESC)

São Paulo 
 São Paulo State Technological Colleges (FATEC)
 São Paulo State University (UNESP)
 State University of Campinas (Unicamp)
 University of São Paulo (USP)
 University of Taubaté (Unitau)

Tocantins
 (UNITINS)

References

 
Brazil
State universities
Universities